Iloilo , officially the Province of Iloilo,  is a province in the Philippines located in the Western Visayas region. Its capital is the City of Iloilo, the regional center of Western Visayas. Iloilo occupies a major southeast portion of the Visayan island of Panay and is bordered by the province of Antique to the west, Capiz to the north, the Jintotolo Channel to the northeast, the Guimaras Strait to the east, and the Iloilo Strait and Panay Gulf to the southwest.

Just off Iloilo's southeast coast is the island province of Guimaras, once part of Iloilo but now an independent province. Across Panay Gulf and Guimaras Strait is Negros Occidental, occupying the northwestern half of the larger island of Negros. Iloilo City, its capital, is the center of the Iloilo–Guimaras Metropolitan Area or Metro Iloilo–Guimaras, and is geographically located in the province and grouped under it by the Philippine Statistics Authority, but remains politically independent from the provincial government. According to the 2020 census, the population of the province (excluding Iloilo City) is 2,051,899. If Iloilo City is included, the population is 2,509,525 in total.

Iloilo is renowned for its rich history and culture, which has resulted in the preservation of numerous old Spanish-era historic sites, including the Miag-ao Church, a UNESCO World Heritage Site in the Philippines, and San Joaquin Campo Santo, which, along with San Joaquin Church and Santa Barbara Church, has been recognized as a National Cultural Treasure by the National Museum of the Philippines. While the southern portion of the province is noted for its Spanish-era churches and structures, the northern portion is noted for its white sand beaches and crystal clear waters, namely the Bantigue Sand Bar, the Tangke Lagoon, Cabugao Island, and Antonia Island, which are all part of the Islas de Gigantes. Sicogon Island, located to the south of the group of islands, is also a tourist island destination in the province that is slowly regaining its popularity after the stalled development caused by martial law in the 1970s.

Etymology
The name of the province is derived from Iloilo City, which in turn is derived from the older name "Ilong-ilong" (Philippine Spanish: Ilong̃-ílong̃) meaning "nose-like", in (Fijian Mirror - English) referring to the promontory between two rivers (Iloilo and Batiano) where the Fort San Pedro and the 17th-century Spanish port were located.

History

Before the arrival of the Europeans

No pre-Hispanic written accounts of Iloilo and Panay island exist today. Oral tradition, in the form of recited epics like the Hinilawod, has survived to a small degree. A few recordings of these epic poems exist. The most notable are the works of noted Filipino Anthropologist Felipe Jocano.

While no current archaeological evidence exist describing pre-Hispanic Iloilo, an original work by Pedro Alcantara Monteclaro published in 1907 called Maragtas details the alleged accounts of the founding of the various pre-Hispanic polities on Panay Island. The book is based on oral and written accounts available to the author at the time.  The author made no claim on the historical accuracy of the accounts.

According to Maragtas, Madja-as was founded after ten datus fled Borneo and landed on Panay Island. The book then goes on to detail their subsequent purchase of the coastal lands in which they settled from the native Ati people.

Datu Paiburong, one of the ten fleeing datus, established a settlement and named it Irong-Irong after an islet of the same name on the Batiano River.

Colonial era
Spain eventually succeeded on conquering of the island of Panay when Spanish conquistador Miguel López de Legazpi moved his headquarters from the island of Cebu and creating the first Spanish settlement in the island in Ogtong in 1566. This is mainly due in part to the rivalries between the Bisaya and the Moro, of which the former found an ally in Spanish against the latter. The Bisayas accepted alliances with Spain, to defend themselves against the enslaving Moros. To this end, Iloilo contributed troops in the Castille War against the Sultanate of Brunei.

In 1581, the encomienda in Ogtong was moved to La Villa Rica de Arevalo, because of frequent coastal raids by the Dutch privateers. Furthermore, an attack in the year 1600 (Part of the Spanish–Moro conflict) where there was a large Muslim armada to destroy Iloilo City, led by two Moros named Sirungan and Salikala who lead the Muslim force of 70 ships and 4,000 warriors that had raided and attacked several Visayan islands in order to abduct slaves to sell to their allies in the Sultanate of Demak and the Sultanate of Malacca, eventually caused the move of the city center further on to the mouth of the Irong-Irong river founding what is now Iloilo City and constructing Fort San Pedro to defend it in 1616.

Nevertheless, when the 4,000 Moros led by Sirungan and Salikala tried to attack Iloilo City they were repulsed with heavy losses in the town of Arevalo by a force of 1,000 Hiligaynon warriors and 70 Mexican arquebusiers under the command of Juan García de Sierra, the Spanish officer who died in the battle. The Spanish Christianized the area.
 
Soon, the area itself began to prosper, due to its successful textile and sugar industry. As a result, it received Chinese immigrants from the west (that worked for its trades) and Latinos from the ports of Mexico in the east (to man its military installations).

During the American colonial period, Iloilo became a home to many firsts: including the first department stores and cinema theaters in the Commonwealth of the Philippines. Iloilo experienced severe devastation during the events of World War II. It became a province of the newly fledged Republic of the Philippines when the archipelago gained independence from the United States on July 4, 1946.

Geography

The province covers a total area of  occupying the central and eastern section of Panay island in the Western Visayas region. The province is bordered by the province of Antique to the west, Capiz to the north, the Jintotolo Channel to the northeast, the Visayan Sea and Guimaras Strait to the east, and the Iloilo Strait and Panay Gulf to the southwest.

The province is divided into two distinct geographic regions; the highlands of the Central Panay Mountain Range on the western border and the lowland plains which account for a larger portion of the province. Small islands east of its northernmost tip also dot the Visayan Sea - of these, Pan de Azucar and Sicogon are well-known. Other peaks are Mount Llorente 4,409 ft. (1,344m), Mount Sansanan 4,219 ft. (1,286m), Mount Napulak 4,095 ft. (1,248 m), Mount Balabag 3,728 ft. (1,136m).

Expansive fishponds and mangrove wetlands are found along the coasts and rivers of Iloilo City and the towns of Oton, Leganes, Zarraga, Dumangas, Anilao, Banate, Barotac Viejo, Barotac Nuevo, Ajuy, Balasan and Carles.

Topography

List of peaks in Iloilo by elevation:
Mount Baloy
Mount Inaman
Mount Igdalig
Mount Tiran

Rivers

List of rivers in Iloilo by length:
Jalaur River
Tigum River
Lamunan River
Ulian River (Laglag)
Suage River
Aganan River
Sibalom River, Tigbauan
Guimbal River
Asisig River
Alawihaw River
Tangyan River
Balantian River
Barotac Viejo River
Sara River
Siuaragan River
Barotac Nuevo River
Lawigan River
Cata-an River
Banate River
Tiolas River
Tumagbok River
Oyungan River
Iloilo River

Administrative divisions
The Province of Iloilo consists of 42 municipalities and two cities (one component and one highly urbanized).

Climate

Demographics

People from Iloilo are called Ilonggos. There are three local languages used in the province: Hiligaynon (Ilonggo), Kinaray-a and Capiznon. Hiligaynon and dialects/variants of it are spoken in Iloilo City and in some towns of the province, especially to the northeast. Tagalog and English are widely used as administrative, educational, and commercial languages.

Language

Hiligaynon is concentrated in the city of Iloilo and surrounding areas, as well as the northeastern portion of the province, Guimaras and the Negros Island (especially in Negros Occidental and to a lesser extent in Negros Oriental), as well as the provinces of South Cotabato, Sultan Kudarat, and North Cotabato in Soccsksargen, Mindanao. It is also spoken in the neighboring provinces, such as Capiz, Antique, Aklan, Masbate, Palawan and Romblon as well as in some parts of Maguindanao. It is also spoken as a second language by Cebuano speakers in Negros Oriental, Kinaray-a speakers in Antique, Aklanon/Malaynon speakers in Aklan, and Capiznon speakers in Capiz.

The language is referred to as Ilonggo in Iloilo and Negros Occidental. More precisely, Ilonggo is an ethno-linguistic group referring to the people living in southeastern Panay and its associated culture. The boundaries of the language called Ilonggo and that called Hiligaynon are unclear. The disagreement of which name is correct extends to Philippine language specialists and native laypeople.

Religion
Iloilo is a Roman Catholic-predominated province comprising about 87% of the population. Independent Catholic and Protestant churches also exist such as members of Iglesia Filipina Independiente or Aglipayan Church, Baptists, Presbyterians, Methodists, Adventists, and other Evangelical Christians; There are also non-Protestant and other Christian sects such as Iglesia Ni Cristo, Church of Christ of Latter day Saints (Mormons) and Jehovah's Witnesses while non-Christians are usually represented by Muslims, and to a lesser extent, Buddhists and Hindus.

Economy

Iloilo's economy is vibrant, because of good political will and the cooperation of the Ilonggos. Iloilo's "economic boom" made thousands of jobs, and made the province one of the most competitive in the country. Iloilo City is the center for real estate, accommodation, medical centers, education, shopping centers, business centers, IT/BPO centers and many more. Iloilo's northern part consists of a strong fishing industry and a booming tourism industry. It is near the Visayan Sea, which makes that part of province one of the leading areas in fisheries in the nation. The central part is an agri-industrial center producing a wide array of agricultural products such as corn, rice, bananas, pineapples and sugar among others as well as high-end crops in the Bucari Area in Leon and in the highlands of Alimodian, as well as inland resorts and trekking sites. The sugar industries is centered in Passi City and its neighboring towns like Lambunao, Duenas, San Enrique and Bingawan. Southern Iloilo's economy is mostly based on tourism because of the century-old churches and colonial buildings and its beaches and marine reserves especially in Guimbal, Miagao and San Joaquin towns.

Government

 Governor: Arthur R. Defensor, Jr.
 Vice Governor: Christine S. Garin

Provincial board members

1st District:
 Marcelo Valentine S. Serag
 Carmelo N. Nochete

2nd District:
 June S. Mondejar
 Rolito S. Cajilig

3rd District:
 Matt P. Palabrica
 Jason R. Gonzales

4th District:
 Domingo B. Oso, Jr.
 Rolando B. Distura

5th District:
 Binky April M. Tupas
 Carol-V Espinosa-Diaz

Ex-officio Board Members:
 PCL President: Ramon G. Sullano
 LNB President: Dorothy G.Paes
 PPSK President: Angelica Bianca B. Requinto

District Representatives
 1st District: Janette L. Garin
 2nd District: Michael B. Gorriceta
 3rd District: Lorenz R. Defensor
 4th District: Ferjenel G. Biron
 5th District: Raul "Boboy" C. Tupas

Culture
Spanish architecture can be seen in old buildings in downtown Iloilo. Ancient Indonesians, Malaysians and Vietnamese, and later the Indian, Arab, Chinese, Korean and Japanese merchants were already trading with the Ilonggos, long before the arrival of the Mexicans, Spaniards and other Europeans. The ruling Spanish government encouraged these foreign merchants to trade in Iloilo but they were not given privileges like ownership of land. Foreign merchants and Spaniards intermarried with the locals, and the Mestizo class was eventually born from their union.  The Mestizo offspring of the local nobilities later emerged as the ruling class of the Ilonggos (see Principalía).

The town's fiesta is one of the most important events for Ilonggos. Almost every town (municipality) in Iloilo, and even the seven districts of Iloilo City, has a fiesta or festival celebrated annually.

Iloilo is also home to two of the nation's cultural minorities the Sulod-Bukidnon and the Ati.

Tourism

As a leading province during the Spanish Colonial Era, the province of Iloilo is widely known for its beautiful old world architecture similar to that of Latin American Countries. Spanish colonial Churches are amongst the well-known tourist sites in the province. Some natural sites are also in here as well as mixed-use parks that sprawl around the province.

Miag-ao Church. A World Heritage Site. The Aztec-Baroque inspired church with Filipino botanicals used to carved on the façade. It is known for its intricate façade and pyramidal bell towers. The church was used as a fortress during the olden days. It is a massive structure built of yellowish Limestones.

Molo Church. The Gothic Renaissance Church of Molo was used as a watch tower to warn the people if there are any attackers on the shore of Iloilo City. It is a fine coral stone church with Classical and Gothic details. It is also known as the feminist church because of the beautiful female saints lining inside the church.

Jaro Cathedral. The Neo-Romanesque church has a distinctive feature with its bell tower as it is located across a busy street from the church, on Jaro Plaza. Though the belfry was adjacent to an earlier church, an earthquake destroyed the church and left the tower. In response to Molo Church's all-female theme, the church has its all-male ensemble of saints placed on the main pillars inside, with the exception of the Virgin's icon.

Jaro Belfry. The belfry was used to serve as a watch tower against marauding Moros during Spanish times. It is made of bricks and limestone blocks, and has three stories, standing 29 meters high. In the 1787 earthquake, the belfry was heavily damaged. Reconstruction only began in 1833 under the supervision of an Augustinian friar, Fr. Jesse Alvarez.

Cabatuan Church. This Neoclassic Church, known to be the most massive Hispanic structure in Iloilo is built of red bricks. It is believed to be the largest red brick structure in the Visayas and it was given the title "Model of Temples" by the 'El Eco de Panay'. The Cabatuan Church is known to be the only extant Spanish colonial church with three facades.

San Jose Church. The beautiful church in front of plaza Libertad is considered the most historic amongst the churches in Iloilo City. It is a Byzantine-Neoclassic Church planned to look like the Spanish Church of Valencia del Cid. The Church is known for its collection of priceless Catholic treasures.

San Joaquin Church. The militaristic church on the coast of San Joaquin overlooks the sea. Carved on a disproportionately large pediment on the façade is an intricate sculptural relief depicting the Spanish victory over Moroccan forces in the Battle of Tetuan. The church is one of the National Cultural Treasures in Iloilo by the National Museum of the Philippines, together with San Joaquin Campo Santo.

San Joaquin Campo Santo. A Roman Catholic cemetery known for its imposing Spanish Baroque mortuary chapel that shows a hint of oriental influences. Its hexagonal shape is supported with walls made from coral stones quarried from the nearby coast, fossils, and red clay bricks, while its dome roof consists of galvanized iron sheets. The cemetery is the grandest and best preserved in the province.

Passi City Church. This is considered a militaristic church in that it was planned as a ‘fortress church’ and the proof of this can be seen in the massive buttresses which support the front and back walls of the church. The church was built to replace churches that had been destroyed by an earthquake in 1612 and subsequent churches that had been destroyed by fires.

Old Capitol building of the Province of Iloilo. A National Historical Site. The building was built with wood stone during the Spanish colonization. It served as the capitol when the civil government of Iloilo was founded in 1901. The National Historical Institute (NHI) formally recognized the Old Capitol as a historical landmark through a marker installed on its walls on April 11, 2010.

Bucari Area. Bucari Area is an area with mountainous terrain situated in the highlands of Leon and Alimodian. It is known as the "Summer Capital of Iloilo" and declared as a special economic zone for tourism and ecological enterprise due to its cool climate, topography, highland attractions and scenery.

Bulabog Putian National Park. Bulabog Puti-an National Park is a protected rain forest area known for being a living museum of flora and fauna. Hundreds of local and foreign tourists visit the 847 eco-tourism park to immerse in the area's natural attractions such as its various forms of wildlife and more than 30 caves. It is located within the municipalities of San Enrique and Dingle.

Islas de Gigantes. The Islas de Gigantes is an island group found in the offshores of the municipality of Carles. The place is known for its numerous caves, white sand beaches, emerald-like shores and lagoon, and rock formations.

Santa Barbara Church. The Santa Barbara Parish Church and Convent is considered to be the "Cradle of Independence" in Panay and in the Visayas. In 1991, the National Historical Commission of the Philippines declared Santa Barbara Church and Convent as a National Landmark. The church was the site where General Martin Delgado of the Visayan Revolutionary Government started the junta that resulted in the first Cry of Revolution against the Spaniards outside Luzon. It was also used as the general headquarters and military hospital of the revolutionary forces.

Calle Real Heritage District. Calle Real, or the J.M. Basa Street in Iloilo City, was once the main commercial center of the city during the Imperial Spanish and American periods. It houses numerous old colonial buildings, including the popular Eusebio Villanueva Building, formerly known as the International Hotel.

Plaza Libertad. The historic plaza where the flag of the first Philippine Republic was raised in triumph after Spain surrendered Iloilo, its last capital in Asia, to the revolutionary forces led by Gen. Martin Delgado on December 25, 1898.

Iloilo River Esplanade. The Esplanade is Iloilo City's newest hub for dining, leisure and recreation. Poised to be the longest linear park in the country with a current total length of over 9 kilometers.

Iloilo Golf and Country Club. The Iloilo Golf Course and Country Club is the oldest golf course in South East Asia. It all began in the 1850s when the British, led by Iloilo-based Vice Consul Nicholas Loney known today as the “Father of the Philippine Sugar Industry."

Infrastructure

Iloilo International Airport

The airport serves the Province of Iloilo, including its capital city, Iloilo City, the regional center of the Western Visayas region in the Philippines. It opened its doors to commercial traffic on June 14, 2007, after a decade of planning and construction located at Cabatuan, Iloilo, replacing Mandurriao Airport in Mandurriao, Iloilo City and inherited its IATA and ICAO airport codes from its predecessor. The fourth-busiest airport in the Philippines, it is the first airport in both Western Visayas and the island of Panay to be built to international standards, and one of the four airports in the region planned to be an international gateway. It is one of three international airports in Western Visayas, the others being Kalibo International Airport and Bacolod-Silay International Airport.

Sicogon Airport 
The airport serves tourists to the island of Sicogon in Carles, Iloilo. The airport has been redeveloped and opened in 2018. Charter flights to and from Sicogon to Manila and vice versa took place in late 2018. It is located in Barangay San Fernando on the island.

Iloilo Port Complex

The Port of Iloilo, considered the leader of trade and a commercial hub for Western Visayas is also one of the safest natural seaports in the Philippines. The Iloilo Commercial Port Complex is located on 20.8 hectares of reclaimed land. It includes 11,400 sq. meters of open space for operations, supplemented by an area of 97,000 sq. meters, a crane, rails of 348 lineal meters; roll-on-roll-off support; a 7,800 container freight stations; and a 720 sq. meter passenger shed. The port complex is ideal for ships plying international routes having a berth length of 400 meters, a width of 26.26 meters and a berthing depth of 10.50 meters.

A number of shipping companies use the Port of Iloilo, including Lorenzo Shipping Corporation, 2GO, Amigo Shipping Company, New Panay Shipping Company, Sulpicio Lines, and Trans-Asia Shipping Lines Inc. Fast ferries serve Iloilo-Bacolod routes eight times daily. 2GO inter-island, overnight ferries serve longer routes, going to Manila, Bacolod, Cebu, Zamboanga and Cagayan de Oro City. Pumpboat ferries cross the Iloilo Strait to Guimaras constantly during the day and on special trips at night.

Roll-on/roll-off ferry service, known as RO-RO, is available between Iloilo City and Guimaras, but the ro-ro to Negros is available from Dumangas, Iloilo including ro-ro from Iloilo to Palawan.

It is ranked third in terms of ship calls at 11,853, fourth in cargo throughout at 491,719 million metric tons and fourth in passenger traffic at 2.4 million annually.

Accessibility
Iloilo is one of the most accessible provinces in the Philippines. Iloilo can be reached by plane on regular commercial international flights from Hong Kong and Singapore to the Iloilo International Airport. Direct domestic flights connect Iloilo to other major cities in the Philippines including Manila, Cebu, Davao, General Santos, Puerto Princesa, Zamboanga and Cagayan de Oro. Direct ferry routes and roll-on roll-off connections on the Philippines’ nautical highway are also available between Iloilo and all other major cities in the country.

By plane, travel time to the Iloilo takes around 1 hour from Manila, 30 minutes from Cebu, 2 hours and 30 minutes from Hong Kong, and 3 hours and 30 minutes from Singapore. By direct ferry, Iloilo is approximately 1.5 hours away from Bacolod, and 15 minutes away from Guimaras. By land, Iloilo is around 4–5 hours away from Boracay, 3 hours away from Kalibo, and 2 hours away from Roxas City.

Iloilo transportation gateways

Iloilo International Airport – The Iloilo International Airport is the primary gateway to Iloilo. It serves regularly scheduled direct domestic flights to Iloilo from major Philippine airlines including Manila, Cebu, Davao, General Santos, Puerto Princesa, and Cagayan de Oro. The airport also serves international flights from Iloilo to Hong Kong and Singapore. Flights to Iloilo are served by Cebu Pacific, Philippine Airlines, PAL Express, and TigerAir. The Iloilo Airport is located approximately 19 kilometers or 20 minutes away by taxi from Iloilo City.

Iloilo Seaports – Ferries in Iloilo depart and arrive at various seaports in Iloilo City and Iloilo Province depending on the route and vessel type. (1) Ferry terminals along the Iloilo River in Lapuz district, Iloilo City serves fastcraft ferries to and from Bacolod, RORO ferries to and from Guimaras, and ferries to and from Palawan. (2) The Iloilo Domestic Port in Fort San Pedro, Iloilo City Proper, serves shipping companies with routes to and from Manila, Cebu, Cagayan de Oro, and Zamboanga.

Universities and colleges

The province of Iloilo, including the city of Iloilo, is the center of education in the Western Visayas region. It has the largest number of universities in the region, with a total of ten major universities.
Universities:
 Central Philippine University, Jaro, Iloilo City
 Iloilo Science and Technology University, La Paz, Iloilo City (with branch campuses in Barotac Nuevo, Leon and Miag-ao)
 Iloilo State University of Science and Technology, Barotac Nuevo (with branch campuses in Dingle, Dumangas, and San Enrique)
 John B. Lacson Foundation Maritime University, Molo, Iloilo City (with branch campus in Arevalo, Iloilo City)
 Northern Iloilo State University, Estancia (with branch campuses in Ajuy, Barotac Viejo, Batad, Concepcion, Lemery, and Sara)
 St. Paul University Iloilo, Iloilo City Proper
 University of Iloilo, Iloilo City Proper
 University of San Agustin, Iloilo City Proper (with branch campus in Jaro, Iloilo City)
 University of the Philippines Visayas, Iloilo City Proper and Miag-ao (Main Campus)
 West Visayas State University, La Paz, Iloilo City (with branch campuses in Calinog, Janiuay, Lambunao/CAF, Lambunao/East, and Pototan)

Colleges:
 ABBA Institute of Technology, Iloilo City Proper
 ACSI College Iloilo, Iloilo City Proper
 ABE International Business College (Iloilo campus), Iloilo City Proper
 AMA Computer College (Iloilo campus), Iloilo City Proper
 Asian College of Aeronautics, Jaro, Iloilo City
 Cabalum Western College, Iloilo City Proper
 Colegio de San Jose, Jaro, Iloilo City
 Colegio del Sagrado Corazon de Jesus, Iloilo City Proper
 Computer College of the Visayas, Iloilo City Proper
 De Paul College, Jaro, Iloilo City
 Dominican College of Iloilo, Zarraga
 FAST Aviation Academy Inc. Iloilo, Jaro, Iloilo City
 Gov. Angel Medina Foundation College, Passi City
 Great Saviour College, La Paz, Iloilo City
 Hua Siong College of Iloilo, Iloilo City Proper
 Iloilo City Community College, Molo, Iloilo City
 Iloilo Doctors' College, Molo, Iloilo City
 Iloilo Doctors' College of Medicine, Molo, Iloilo City
 Iloilo State College of Fisheries, Barotac Nuevo
 Iloilo Technical College, Iloilo City Proper
 Integrated Midwives Association of the Philippines Foundation School of Midwifery, La Paz, Iloilo City
 Interface Computer College (Iloilo campus), Iloilo City Proper
 Leon Ganzon Polythechnic College, Balasan
 New Lucena Polytechnic College, New Lucena
 Passi City College, Passi City
 Philippine College of Aeronautics, Science and Technology, Jaro, Iloilo City
 St. Anne College of Iloilo, Mandurriao, Iloilo City
 St. Therese – MTC colleges, Molo, Iloilo City (with branch campuses in La Paz, Iloilo City and Tigbauan)
 St. Vincent College of Science and Technology, Leganes
 St. Vincent Ferrer Seminary, Jaro, Iloilo City
 STI College (Iloilo campus), Iloilo City Proper
 St. Vincent College of Business and Accountancy, Pototan
 Santa Isabel College of Iloilo City, Mandurriao, Iloilo City
 Western Institute of Technology, La Paz, Iloilo City 

Special Schools:
SPED-Integrated School for Exceptional Children, Iloilo City Proper

Sports teams
Stallion F.C. is an association football club founded in Barotac Nuevo. The club is affiliated with the Iloilo Football Association and currently playing in Division 1 of the United Football League. Since 2018, Kaya F.C. has played its home game in Iloilo. It is also the home of the Iloilo United Royals who play for MPBL.
Kaya F.C.–Iloilo is a Filipino professional football club based in Iloilo City. It plays in the Philippines Football League, the highest tier of Philippine football. The club has won one UFL cup and one Copa Paulino Alcantara. Kaya has also competed in the AFC Cup.

Media

Iloilo City is home to regional television stations of GMA Network (GMA TV6 & GMA News TV 28), TV5 (UHF 36 & AksyonTV 46), Solar channels (9TV TV-4) ETC UHF 32 & 2nd Avenue UHF 24), IBC (VHF 12), (BEAM UHF 26) and ABS-CBN (ABS-CBN TV10, ABS-CBN Sports+Action (UHF 38)).

Notable people

References

External links

 
 
 
 Iloilo Travel Website 
 Republic of the Philippines: Official website of the Provincial Government of Iloilo
 Philippine Standard Geographic Code

 
Provinces of the Philippines
Provinces of Western Visayas
States and territories established in 1566
1566 establishments in the Philippines